Palla Mahbub Adarsha High School is a secondary school situated at Palla Bazar, Chatkhil Upazila, Noakhali, Chittagong, Bangladesh. Its educational system is very good. Most of the students are very happy. Palla Mahbub Adarsha High School`s Eiin number is 107261.

References

External links
 http://palla-mahbub-adarsha-high-school.blogspot.com
 https://web.archive.org/web/20131113205132/http://www.palla-high-school.yolasite.com/
 https://www.facebook.com/palla.school
 https://plus.google.com/114272978418748461340

Schools in Noakhali District
Chatkhil Upazila